Daniil Simkin (born 12 October 1987 in Novosibirsk, Russia) is a ballet dancer and entrepreneur, best known for his accomplished technical skill and charismatic stage presence. He is a principal dancer with both American Ballet Theatre and Berlin State Ballet. Simkin is based in Berlin and New York, and is the founder of Studio Simkin.

Overview
Simkin is an international principal dancer who performs leading roles in the classical and contemporary ballet repertoire. He is currently considered one of the leading male ballet dancers worldwide.

His early social media presence and success in competitions initiated his rise to principal dancer. His recent work explores dance across a broad range of artistic influences and genres. In 2021, he developed Studio Simkin to promote dance across an ever-evolving digital platform.

Simkin cites inspiration from dancers Mikhail Baryshnikov, Rudolf Nureyev, and his father, Dmitrij Simkin: "I would take Mr. Baryshnikov’s technique and coordination, Mr. Nureyev’s charisma and stage presence and my father’s work ethic, put them all in a shaker and you would have the perfect male ballet dancer." He has been called "the new Baryshnikov" by the French press.

Early life and training
Born in Novosibirsk, Russia, Simkin grew up in Wiesbaden, Germany. His parents, former ballet dancers Dmitrij Simkin and Olga Aleksandrova, met when performing at the Bolshoi Theater in Moscow. His half-brother, Anton Alexandrov (born 1977) danced with Hamburg Ballet and is now a ballet teacher.

Simkin studied ballet privately with his mother as her first student. He received a conventional academic education in Wiesbaden, and completed Abitur, the German qualification to attend university, alongside his ballet studies. As a student, he performed corps and soloist roles with Ballet Wiesbaden from 1993 to 2006.

Career 
After receiving a Senior Gold Medal from the 2006 USA International Ballet Competition in Jackson, Mississippi, Simkin was invited to perform in the gala "Stars of the 21st Century" in Paris, and then in New York. Simkin joined Wiener Staatsballett (Vienna State Ballet) in 2006, and was promoted to first soloist in 2007.

In 2008, Simkin joined American Ballet Theatre as a soloist, where he went on to perform a huge roster of signature roles. He has been called "a dancer happiest in the air" by The New York Times critic Gia Kourlas.

Simkin was promoted to principal dancer at ABT in December 2012. During the following years, he performed leading roles in classical and neoclassical repertoire (see list below) including Don Quixote, Prodigal Son, Swan Lake, and The Boy with Matted Hair in Antony Tudor's Shadowplay. He performed works by choreographers including George Balanchine, Jerome Robbins, Paul Taylor, Twyla Tharp and Merce Cunningham as well as created ballets with choreographers such as Benjamin Millepied and Alexei Ratmansky. The New York Times has described how Simkin's musicality allows him "ample time to show the inner workings of each step," and W Magazine has highlighted his "space spanning leaps" and "virtuosic aplomb."

In 2018, Simkin joined Staatsballett Berlin (Berlin State Ballet) as a principal dancer, a position he holds parallel to his spot with ABT. Simkin told Dance that the transition would allow him to perform more European-centric contemporary choreography than had been available for him at ABT. "I'm excited to expand my spectrum of choreographers," he said. "I believe in the concept of a company that can create something cutting edge while also dancing classical works." Simkin's love of electronic music and the potential for Berlin's club scene to filter into the ballet world was another appeal. During his first season with the company, Alexei Ratmansky created a new La Bayadère for the company, in which Simkin danced the role of Solor.

In 2021, Simkin was featured as the first teacher on the new platform "Dance-Masterclass," where he outlined his approach to pirouettes and turns. As creator Caspar Hees told Pointe: "[Simkin] breaks down the major elements, from balance to the preparation to the upper body, and offers exercises, turn combinations and a few of his own secrets." With Dance Masterclass, Simkin co-produced an interview with ballerina Sylvie Guillem.

International recognition 
One of Simkin's most celebrated roles is Basil in Don Quixote, which he has performed since the age of 19, and has presented all over the world alongside such partners as Maria Kochetkova and Isabella Boylston. He was the first dancer to ever perform three 540s in a row.

Simkin has an especially enthusiastic fanbase in Japan. He has appeared on the cover of major Japanese magazines, and has expressed his love of anime and Japanese culture. On his own cultural identity: "I think of my use of language as a metaphor. I speak Russian, English, German, and a little French, each with an accent. I’m not perfect in any one language, and it’s similar with my national and personal identity."

Simkin has performed in numerous countries on six continents. He has produced International Ballet Gala Events in Greece 2009 and Japan 2012. He has also danced frequently with theaters including the Bolshoi Theater, Moscow; the Mariinsky Theater, St. Petersburg; Opera National de Paris; London Coliseum and Sadler's Wells, London; National Center for Performing Arts, Beijing; The Music Center, Los Angeles; Lyric Theater and Auditorium Theater, Chicago; Kennedy Center for the Performing Arts, Washington DC; Bunka Kaikan, Tokyo; Queensland Performing Arts Center, Brisbane; Royal Opera House, Stockholm; Royal Danish Theater, Copenhagen; Gran Teatro de Liceu, Barcelona; Terme Di Caracalla, Rome; Teatro Arcimboldo, Milan; Megaro Mousikis Theater, Athens; Royal Opera House, Oman; National Opera, Seoul; National Theater, Taipei; and Teatro Colón, Buenos Aires.

Recurring international guest performances have included the World Ballet Festival in Tokyo, Japan; Stars of the 21st Century Ballet Galas in Toronto, Paris, New York and Moscow; International Ballet Star Gala in Taipei; Youth America Grand Prix Gala, New York; International Ballet Star Gala, Buenos Aires; and Roberto Bolle and Friends, with performances throughout Italy.

Social media: a new platform for dance 
"Nowadays we have the possibility of connecting with the audience directly," Simkin has told The New York Times. Simkin's efforts to make ballet accessible, and to connect a large and broad audience to the art form, began with an early and active social media presence.

Today, he maintains a digital presence on his Instagram page @daniil, as well as a page dedicated to his personal photography @daniilsees In 2015, The New York Times covered his process of photographing dancers backstage, just before and after the performance: "I mean, that is our goal, to make it look simple, natural and sort of like it doesn’t cost us anything," he said. "We are having a good time, and we are floating. But in order to make it look like that, we sacrifice our lives."

"The internet has become the place for individuals to create their own brands, and being a good dancer isn't always enough," Simkin says. "But I still consider onstage performance the ultimate test. I've noticed that the possibilities in male technique are advancing at a quicker pace, in an exponential way. It will be interesting to see where it will go."

Independent productions 
With independent productions, Simkin explores new outlets for dance, including virtual or augmented realities, immersive dance performances, and new dance films. These projects have offered an opportunity for Simkin to explore every aspect of the creative process, as well as executive production and fundraising.

Intensio, 2015, co-production with the Joyce Theater in New York. Repertory: Gregory Dolbashian's Welcome a Stranger, Jorma Elo's Nocturne/Etude/Prelude, Alexander Ekman's biographical Simkin and the Stage, and Anna Lopez Ochoa's Islands of Memories, the first ballet ever to be performed using real-time generated, video projections that are responsive to the dance. It premiered at Jacob's Pillow Dance Festival in July 2015, toured to Houston and Buenos Aires in November 2015, and ran at the Joyce for a week in January 2016. Dancers at the New York debut included Isabella Boylston, Alexandre Hammoudi, Blaine Hoven, Calvin Royal III, Hee Seo, Cassandra Trenary, James Whiteside, and Céline Cassone.

Falls the Shadow, 2017, co-production with the Guggenheim Museum, New York; a multi-disciplinary dance installation. Choreography by Alejandro Cerrudo. Video designer, Dmitrij Simkin in partnership with interactive media designer Arístides Job García Hernández. Costumes by Dior. "With the added layer of the architecture up the Guggenheims’ rotunda, the choreography took on new dimensions" (The New York Times).

Diorama, 2020, co-production with Staatsballett Berlin, was a dance film conceived at the height of the pandemic with long-time partner Maria Kochetkova. Choreography by Sebastian Kloborg. Music by the Kronos Quartet. As Dance described: "Diorama is dark, and strange—a surreal and bizarre chase." The film received an award for "best screendance film under 10 minutes" at the 2021 San Francisco Dance Film Festival.

Studio Simkin 
In 2021, Simkin founded the production company Studio Simkin to explore and develop dance opportunities for the next era with the highest production value and artistic standard, encouraging ballet to evolve within a digital environment and for new forums. While these productions aim to promote dance as an art form, they are also geared toward collaboration and experiment. Drawing on the German concept of the "Gesamtkunstwerk," he aims to create a unique range of possibilities for dance.

Media projects 
Diorama 

Dance-Masterclass - Daniil Simkin 

Dance-Masterclass - Interview with Silvie Guillem (co-produced by Simkin) 

Lenski Variation - Daniil Simkin 

Daniil Simkin and Maria Kochetkova in Don Quixote 

Simkin and the City 

Simkin and the Quarantine 

aROUND - Olga Aleksandrova and Daniil Simkin 

Simkin vs. Simkin - Dmitrij and Daniil Simkin

Selected repertoire
American Ballet Theatre

 Afterite, Wayne McGregor, Leading Role
 Allegro Brillante, George Balanchine, Leading Role
 La Bayadère, Natalia Makarova after Marius Petipa, Bronze Idol
 Black Tuesday, Paul Taylor, Featured Role
 The Brahms-Haydn Variations, Twyla Tharp, Leading Role
 The Bright Stream, Alexei Ratmansky, Ballet Dancer
 Company B, Paul Taylor, Featured Role
 Coppélia, Frederic Franklin after Arthur Saint-Leon, Franz
 Le Corsaire, Konstantin Sergeyev after Marius Petipa, Lankendem; Ali, the Slave
 Don Quixote (McKenzie/Jones) after Marius Petipa and Alexander Gorsky - Basilio; Lead Gypsy Man
 The Dream, Frederick Ashton - Puck
 Duets, Merce Cunningham  - Featured Role
 Everything Doesn't Happen at Once, Benjamin Millepied - Featured Role*
 Fancy Free, Jerome Robbins - First Sailor
 Flames of Paris, David Holmes and Anna-Marie Holmes after Vasily Vainonen - Leading Role
 Giselle (McKenzie) after Jean Corrali, Jules Perrot, and Marius Petipa  - Albrecht; peasant pas de deux
 The Green Table, Kurt Jooss - Profiteer
 Harlequinade, Alexei Ratmansky after Marius Petipa - Harlequin
 I Feel The Earth Move, Benjamin Millepied  - Leading Role
 In the Upper Room, Twyla Tharp  - Featured Role
 The Leaves Are Fading, Antony Tudor - Featured Role
 Manon, Kenneth MacMillan - Lescaut
 Monotones I and II, Frederick Ashton - Monotones I
 A Month in the Country, Frederick Ashton - Kolia
 Mozartiana, George Balanchine - Gigue
 The Nutcracker, Alexei Ratmansky - Nutcracker, the Prince; Chinese Dance*
 One of Three, Aszure Barton - Featured Role
 Onegin, John Cranko - Lensky
 Piano Concerto #1, Alexei Ratmansky - Leading Role
 Prodigal Son, George Balanchine - Son
 Romeo and Juliet, Kenneth MacMillan - Romeo; Mercutio; Benvolio
 Serenade after Plato's Symposium, Alexei Ratmansky - Leading Role*
 Shadowplay, Antony Tudor - Boy with Matted Hair
 Sinfonietta, Jiří Kylián - Featured Role
 The Sleeping Beauty (McKenzie/Kirkland/Chernov after Marius Petipa) - Prince Désiré; Bluebird
 The Sleeping Beauty (Ratmansky after Petipa) - The Bluebird*
 Le Spectre de la Rose, Michel Fokine - Rose
 Stars and Stripes, George Balanchine - Leading Role (pas de deux)
 Swan Lake (McKenzie after Marius Petipa and Lev Ivanov) - Prince Siegfried; Benno
 La Sylphide (Bruhn, 1983 staging) August Bournonville - Gurn
 Sylvia, Frederick Ashton - Eros; Orion; Goat
 Symphony in C, George Balanchine  - Fourth Movement
 Tchaikovsky Pas de Deux, George Balanchine - Leading Role
 The Tempest, Alexei Ratmansky - Ariel*
 Troika, Benjamin Millepied - Leading Role*
 Whipped Cream, Alexei Ratmansky - The Boy*

*created role

Staatsballett Berlin (Berlin State Ballet)

 La Bayadère, Alexei Ratmansky - Solor
 The Nutcracker, Yuri Burlaka/Vasily Medvedev - Nutcracker Prince
 Onegin, John Cranko - Lensky
 Giselle, Patrice Bart - Albrecht
 La Sylphide, August Bournonville - James
 Jewels, George Balanchine - Rubies
 Theme and Variations, George Balanchine - Leading Role

Awards
2000: First Prize, International Ballet Competition St. Pölten, Austria

2001: First Prize, Fourth International Ballet Competition, Vienna

2002: First Prize, Nyon Ballet Competition, Nyon, Switzerland

2003: First Prize Junior / Encouragement Prize, Prix Grande-Duchesse Maria Teresa, Seventh International Ballet Competition, Luxembourg  

2004: Grand Prix, Fifth International Ballet Competition, Vienna

2004: First Prize Senior, "Mikhail Baryshnikov" for best male dancer, Eighth International Ballet Competition "Arabesque," Perm, Russia

2004: First Prize and gold medal, 21st International Ballet Competition, Varna

2005: Gloria Grand Prix, International Ballet Competition, Helsinki

2006: Men's Senior Gold Medal, USA International Ballet Competition, Jackson

References

External links
 
 
 
 Daniil Simkin at American Ballet Theatre

1987 births
Living people
Russian male ballet dancers
American Ballet Theatre principal dancers
Russian expatriates in Austria
Russian emigrants to Germany
Russian expatriates in the United States
People from Novosibirsk